Paja Brava is also used in Spanish speaking countries to refer to different types of grass

Paja Brava is a Bolivian musical group. The band has had many different musicians that have participated over the years.  The first recording was a self-titled album released in 1977 .

See also
Music of Bolivia

References

Discography

Bolivian musical groups